Joe Krakoski may refer to:

 Joe Krakoski (defensive back) (born 1937), former American player for the Washington Redskins and Oakland Raiders
 Joe Krakoski (linebacker) (born 1962), former American football player for the Washington Redskins